"Gyroscope" is a song by Canadian rock band The Tea Party. It was released as a promotional single in Australia, Canada and the USA. It received airplay on Australian radio station Triple J.

"Gyroscope" started off as just a Middle Eastern-styled riff on a saz, and that is what the bass line became; it started with an Edges of Twilight feel, then the beat was completely reversed and a lot of electronics were added. The band also wrote a Middle Eastern version of the song without lyrics.

Black metal band Melechesh recorded a cover version for their 2006 album Emissaries.

Track listing 
"Babylon"
"Gyroscope"
"Temptation (edit)"
"Temptation"

References 

1998 singles
The Tea Party songs
1997 songs